Round Midnight or  'Round Midnight may refer to:

 "'Round Midnight" (song), a 1944 jazz song by pianist Thelonious Monk
 Round Midnight (Elkie Brooks album), 1993
 'Round Midnight (Kenny Burrell album), 1972
 'Round Midnight (1963 Betty Carter album)
 Round Midnight (1975 Betty Carter album)
 Round Midnight (Philly Joe Jones album), 1980
 Round Midnight (film), a 1986 film by Bertrand Tavernier
 Round Midnight (soundtrack), the soundtrack to the 1986 film by Bertrand Tavernier
 Round Midnight (Time-Life album), a 2008 R&B compilation album

See also
 Around Midnight, a 1960 album by Julie London
 'Round About Midnight, a 1956 jazz album by Miles Davis